Steffi Graf and Rennae Stubbs were the two-time defending champions, but none competed this year. Graf opted to focus on the singles tournament, finishing as runner-up.

Jana Novotná and Arantxa Sánchez Vicario won the title by defeating Eugenia Maniokova and Leila Meskhi 6–3, 6–2 in the final.

Seeds

Draw

Draw

References

External links
 Official results archive (ITF)
 Official results archive (WTA)

Citizen Cup - Doubles
WTA Hamburg
1994 in German women's sport
1994 in German tennis